The Brand rankings of Japanese universities (大学ブランドランキング Daigaku Burando Rankingu) is a ranking of the Japanese universities by Nikkei Business Publications, released annually in November.

It is a ranking system which evaluates the universities' power of brand. According to Nikkei BP, BRJU stands on the idea of "How people think", but not the quality or functions of university. Therefore, questionnaires are done to third-person groups.

Methodology
It is composed by 49 indicators related to the power of brand. Each indicator was calculated by the result of  questionnaires to business(wo)men, people who have children and people related to education in a same region of targeted universities. these indicators are related to not only reputation or popularity, but also various recognitions such as a review of HR. Basically the same methodology of corporate brand research is applied to this ranking systems.

It ranks universities in 5 areas, with Greater Tokyo Area, Hokuriku/Tokai Area, Kansai Area, Chugoku/Shikoku Area and Kyushu/Okinawa Prefecture/Yamaguchi Area. Each university is ranked in its own region's rankings, thus there are no national rankings.

Top 10/20 Universities in the BRJU

Rankings have been conducted on an annual basis since 2009, and apart from the 2009, rankings are all regional, so there is not an overall ranking for universities, rather a ranking within their geographical area.

Greater Tokyo Area

Kansai Area

Chugoku-Shikoku Region

Kyushu and southern Japan 
In 2010 Kyushu University was ranked top in this area.

References

External links
Nikkei BP official website

Japan
Universities and colleges in Japan